You Belong to Me is a 1941 American romantic comedy film produced and directed by Wesley Ruggles and starring Barbara Stanwyck and Henry Fonda. Based on a story by Dalton Trumbo, and written by Claude Binyon, the film is about a wealthy man who meets and falls in love with a beautiful doctor while on a ski trip. After a courtship complicated by his hypochondria, she agrees to marry him on the condition that she continue to practice medicine. His jealousy at the thought of her seeing male patients, however, soon threatens their marriage. The film was released in the United Kingdom as Good Morning, Doctor, and was remade as Emergency Wedding in 1950.

A print is held by the Library of Congress.

Plot
Doctor Helen Hunt meets millionaire playboy, Peter Kirk in an unusual way—he crashes practically at her feet at a ski resort. He insists only she can treat his minor injuries and he soon proposes marriage, which she accepts. On their wedding night, Helen is called away by a medical emergency. When she returns, Peter has fallen asleep. Peter becomes jealous and gets into confrontations with two of her patients, Robert Andrews, and Frederick Vandemer. He is chagrined to learn that Vandemer had also staged a skiing accident to get to know Helen and Vandemer asked her to marry him.

Helen recruits Billings, Peter's groundskeeper, to try unsuccessfully to interest the idle Peter in gardening. After another very embarrassing altercation with Frederick, Peter gets a job as a tie salesman under the alias "John Jenkins" to try to please his wife. Peter finds he likes working and becomes ambitious. Helen is delighted and decides to retire and become a housewife. However, some of Kirk's co-workers at the department store recognize him and resent him taking a job away from somebody who actually needs it.  The incident results in his firing.  Billings gives Peter an idea to create jobs with his money.  Peter decides to buy a nearly-bankrupt hospital, which will require most of his income to keep running, and makes Helen the chief of staff.

Cast
 Barbara Stanwyck as Helen Kirk
 Henry Fonda as Peter Kirk
 Edgar Buchanan as Billings
 Roger Clark as Frederick Vandemer 
 Ruth Donnelly as Emma
 Melville Cooper as Moody
 Ralph Peters as Joseph
 Maude Eburne as Ella
 Renie Riano as Minnie
 Ellen Lowe as Eva
 Mary Treen as Doris
 Gordon Jones as Robert Andrews
 Fritz Feld as Hotel Clerk
 Paul Harvey as Barrows
 Georgia Backus as Attendant (uncredited)
 Sidney Bracey as Frederick Vandemer's Butler (uncredited)
 Lloyd Bridges as Ski Patrol (uncredited)
 Stanley Brown as Ski Patrol (uncredited)
 Georgia Caine as Necktie Customer (uncredited)
 Jeff Corey as Mr. Greener (uncredited)
 Lester Dorr as Photographer (uncredited)
 Howard C. Hickman as Mr. Deker (uncredited)
 Sam McDaniel as Pierre (uncredited)
 George Lessey as Marshall (uncredited)
 Arthur Loft as Reporter (uncredited)

Reception
The film opened on October 22, 1941 to positive reviews.

Bosley Crowther commented that "These tensile marital comedies, strung out on a very thin line, have a way of snapping in the middle unless written and acted to the hilt. This one is fortunate in having a smart script as foundation - bright and easy dialogue and cute situations. It is directed by Wesley Ruggles in a brisk and amiable style, and it is well supported by a cast including Fritz Feld, Edgar Buchanan and Melville Cooper. But the best thing about it is its principals, Mr. Fonda and Miss Stanwyck. He, with his loose-jointed blunderings and charming diffidence, and she with her forthright manner and ability to make a man forget are a right team for this sort of dalliance. You Belong To Me is a bit of well-turned fun."

Variety also praised the performances of Fonda and Stanwyck, which "merit fulsome praise. Their strokes are keen and deft regardless of whether they're playing farce, romance, or the film's more serious moments. Fonda, cast as a rich playboy who suffers a skiing fall and recovers with a medical wife, proves again that he is endowed with a high flair for comedy."

References

External links

1941 romantic comedy films
1941 films
American black-and-white films
1940s English-language films
Films directed by Wesley Ruggles
Films scored by Friedrich Hollaender
American romantic comedy films
Columbia Pictures films
American skiing films
1940s American films

fr:Tu m'appartiens#Cinéma